The Sustut River is a major tributary of the Skeena River in the north-central Interior of British Columbia, Canada. It forms the northwest boundary of the Hogem Ranges and flows southwest to meet the Skeena, north of Hazelton.

See also
Sustut Provincial Park

References

Rivers of British Columbia
Skeena Country
Interior Mountains
Cassiar Land District